The women's 400 metre individual medley event at the 2008 Olympic Games took place on 9–10 August at the Beijing National Aquatics Center in Beijing, China.

Australia's Stephanie Rice pulled away to a strong finish on the freestyle leg, as she claimed an Olympic gold medal in the event. She established a sterling time of 4:29.45 to slash 1.67 seconds off the world record, set by Katie Hoff from the U.S. Olympic Trials. Zimbabwe's Kirsty Coventry also went under a world record, but earned her first silver at these Games, in an African record of 4:29.89. Meanwhile, Hoff did not match her stellar performance from the trials, as she settled only for the bronze in 4:31.71.

Rising American teenager Elizabeth Beisel finished outside the medals in fourth place at 4:34.24, holding off Italy's Alessia Filippi (4:34.34) to fifth by exactly a tenth of a second (0.10). Great Britain's Hannah Miley (4:39.44), Russia's Yana Martynova (4:40.04), and China's Li Xuanxu (4:42.13) rounded out the finale.

Records
Prior to this competition, the existing world and Olympic records were as follows.

The following new world and Olympic records were set during this competition.

Results

Heats

Final

References

External links
Official Olympic Report

Women's individual medley 400 metre
Olympics
2008 in women's swimming
Women's events at the 2008 Summer Olympics